Vladimir Ivelja (born March 20, 1988) is a Serbian professional basketball power forward who play for Hercegovac Gajdobra of the Second Basketball League of Serbia.

References

External links
 Player Profile at fiba.com
 Player Profile at realgm.com
 Player Profile at eurobasket.com

1988 births
Living people
Bosnia and Herzegovina expatriate basketball people in Serbia
BK Iskra Svit players
KK Hercegovac Gajdobra players
KK Lovćen players
KK FMP (1991–2011) players
KK Radnički Novi Sad players
KK Vojvodina Srbijagas players
OKK Vrbas players
Serbian men's basketball players
Serbian expatriate basketball people in Montenegro
Serbian expatriate basketball people in North Macedonia
Serbian expatriate basketball people in Slovakia
Sportspeople from Tuzla
Power forwards (basketball)
Serbs of Bosnia and Herzegovina